William, Willie, Will, Bill or Billy Stewart may refer to:

Entertainment
 Jack Williamson or Will Stewart (1908–2006), American science fiction writer
 William G. Stewart (1933–2017), English television producer, director and presenter of Fifteen to One
 Billy Stewart (1937–1970), American R&B singer and pianist
 Bill Stewart (actor) (1942–2006), English actor best known as Sandy Longford on A Touch of Frost
 Bill Stewart (musician) (born 1966), American jazz drummer

Public officials

Australia and New Zealand
 William Stewart (governor) (1769–1854), Lieutenant Governor of New South Wales
 William James Stewart (businessman) (1855–1924), businessman and mayor of Northam, Western Australia
 William Downie Stewart Sr (1842–1898), member of House of Representatives for City of Dunedin and Dunedin West
 William Downie Stewart Jr (1878–1949), historian; mayor of Dunedin; son of William Downie Stewart Sr.
 William Stewart (New Zealand politician) (1861–1955), Reform Party member of House of Representatives

Canada
 William Stewart (Canada West) (1803–1856), Canadian businessman and political figure
 William J. Stewart (hydrographic surveyor) (1863–1925), Canada's first chief hydrographic surveyor
 William S. Stewart (1855–1938), lawyer, judge and political figure on Prince Edward Island
 William Atcheson Stewart (1915–1990), member of Legislative Assembly of Ontario
 William Douglas Stewart (born 1938), member of House of Commons
 William Dunbar Stewart (1839–?), merchant and political figure on Prince Edward Island
 William James Stewart (1889–1969), mayor of Toronto
 William Stewart (Ontario politician), leader of the Communist party in Ontario in the 1970s

United Kingdom and Ireland
 William Stewart (bishop of Aberdeen) (c. 1490–1545), Scottish clergyman and diplomat
 William Stewart (makar) (c.1476–c.1548), Scottish poet
 William Stewart (Lord Mayor of London), lord mayor of London
 William Stewart (Belfast South MP) (1868–1946), Northern Ireland member of Parliament of the United Kingdom
 William Stewart (Houghton-le-Spring MP) (1878–1960), English member of Parliament
 William Stewart (ILP politician) (1856–1947), Secretary of the Scottish Divisional Council of the Independent Labour Party
 William Stewart (Northern Ireland senator) (born ), member of the Senate of Northern Ireland
 William Stewart (politician, died 1748) (c. 1706–1748), Scottish member of Parliament of Great Britain
 William Stewart (MP for Kirkcudbright) (1737–1797), Scottish member of Parliament of Great Britain
 Sir William Stewart (British Army officer, born 1774) (1774–1827), Scottish member of Parliament of Great Britain
 Sir William Stewart (soldier) (1643–1726), Scots-Irish soldier
 William Stewart, 1st Earl of Blessington (1709–1769), Anglo-Irish peer and member of the House of Lords
 William Stewart, 2nd Viscount Mountjoy (1675–1728), Anglo-Irish peer
 Will Stewart (bishop) (1943–1998), Bishop of Taunton
 Sir William Houston Stewart (1822–1901), Scottish naval officer
 Sir William Stewart of Baldorran (c.1440–c.1500), Scottish landowner
 William Stewart of Caverston, Scottish soldier, captain of Dumbarton Castle
 William Stewart of Grandtully (1567–1646), Scottish landowner and courtier
 Sir William Stewart of Houston (1540–1605), Scottish soldier, privy councilor and diplomat
 William Stewart of Monkton (d. 1588), Scottish landowner
 William Stewart (courtier), Scottish servant to James VI
 William Stewart, Lord Allanbridge (1925–2012), Scottish judge
 William Stewart, 1st Viscount Mountjoy (1653–1692), Anglo-Irish peer and soldier

United States
 William Stewart (Pennsylvania politician) (1810–1876), represented 23rd congressional district from 1857 to 1861
 William Morris Stewart (1827–1909), one of Nevada's first two U.S. senators
 William Thomas Stewart (1853–1935), Utah territorial legislature
 William R. Stewart (1864–1958), second African-American elected to Ohio Senate
 William J. Stewart (Pennsylvania politician) (1950–2016), Pennsylvania politician

Science
 William Alexander Stewart (1930–2002), American sociolinguist
 William Kilpatrick Stewart (1913–1967), Scottish researcher in aerospace physiology
 William H. Stewart (1921–2008), pediatrician and epidemiologist, 10th surgeon general of the United States
 Sir William Stewart (biologist) (born 1935), Scottish microbiologist

Sports

Football
 William Stewart (footballer, born 1868), Scottish footballer who played for Preston North End and Everton in the 1890s
 Willie Stewart (1872–1945), Scottish footballer who played for Newton Heath and Luton Town
 William Stewart (footballer, born 1875), Scottish international footballer who played for Queen's Park and Newcastle United
 Billy Stewart (Australian footballer) (1884–1968), Australian rules footballer for St Kilda
 William Stewart (footballer, born 1897) (1897–1974), Scottish footballer who played for Queen's Park and Shawfield
 William Stewart (footballer, born 1910), Scottish footballer who played for Manchester United and Motherwell
 Bill Stewart (American football) (1952–2012), American football coach
 Billy Stewart (footballer, born 1965), English goalkeeper who played for several clubs, including Chester and Southport

Other sports
 William Stewart (Australian cricketer) (1844–?), Australian cricketer
 William Stewart (English cricketer) (1847–1883), English cricketer
 William Stewart (cyclist) (1883–1950), British Olympic cyclist
 William Stewart (athlete) (1889–1958), Australian sprinter
 William Stewart (rower) (born 1997), British rower
 Bill Stewart (sports official) (1894–1964), American baseball coach and ice hockey referee
 Bill Stewart (athlete) (born 1921), American high jumper
 Bill Stewart (baseball) (1928–2013), American baseball outfielder, Kansas City Athletics
 William Payne Stewart (1957–1999), American golfer
 Bill Stewart (ice hockey) (born 1957), Canadian ice hockey defenceman

Other people
 William Stewart (skipper) (fl. c. 1580-1610) was a Scottish sea captain from Dundee.
 William Robert Stewart (died 1818), American ship captain
 William W. Stewart (1776–1851), Scottish-born whaler, sealer and settler
 Sir William Drummond Stewart (1795–1871), Scottish adventurer and British military officer
 George Stewart (VC) (William George Drummond Stewart, 1831–1868), Scottish recipient of Victoria Cross; Crimean War veteran
 William Boyd Stewart (1835–1912), Canadian pastor, writer, and educator
 William Alvah Stewart (1903–1953), American federal judge
 William Stewart (skipper) (fl. c. 1580–1610) was a, Scottish sea captain
 Bill Stewart (journalist) (1941–1979), American TV correspondent for ABC News
 Bill Stewart (programmer) (1950–2009), American software creator

See also
 William Steuart (disambiguation)
 Stewart (name)
 William Stuart (disambiguation)